The 2016 STP 500 was a NASCAR Sprint Cup Series race held on April 3, 2016, at Martinsville Speedway in Ridgeway, Virginia. Contested over 500 laps on the .526 mile (.847 km) paperclip-shaped short track, it was the sixth race of the 2016 NASCAR Sprint Cup Series season. Kyle Busch won the race. A. J. Allmendinger finished second, while Kyle Larson, Austin Dillon and Brad Keselowski rounded out the top-five.

Joey Logano won the pole for the race and led 21 laps on his way to an 11th-place finish. Busch led a race high of 352 laps on his way to scoring the victory. The race had 11 lead changes among five different drivers and eight caution flag periods for 51 laps.

This was the 35th career victory for Busch, first of the season, first at Martinsville Speedway and ninth at the track for Joe Gibbs Racing. With the win, he moved up to third in the points standings. Despite being the winning manufacturer, Toyota left Martinsville trailing Chevrolet by three points in the manufacturer standings.

The STP 500 was carried by Fox Sports on the cable/satellite Fox Sports 1 network for the American television audience. The radio broadcast for the race was carried by the Motor Racing Network and Sirius XM NASCAR Radio.

Report

Background

Martinsville Speedway is an International Speedway Corporation-owned NASCAR stock car racing track located in Henry County, in Ridgeway, Virginia, just to the south of Martinsville. At  in length, it is the shortest track in the NASCAR Sprint Cup Series. The track was also one of the first paved oval tracks in NASCAR, being built in 1947 by H. Clay Earles. It is also the only remaining race track that has been on the NASCAR circuit from its beginning in 1948.

Entry list
The entry list for the STP 500 was released on Monday, March 28 at 1:50 p.m. Eastern time. Forty cars were entered for the race.

First practice
Trevor Bayne went to his backup car after crashing his primary in the final 30 seconds of the session.

Qualifying

He joined Jeff Gordon, Mark Martin, Darrell Waltrip and Glen Wood as the only drivers to have earned three-consecutive poles at Martinsville. He said afterwards that it was "nice to be able to go up here and do what we know how to do - execute qualifying like we know how to at this racetrack. Ever since we unloaded this morning it was top of the board, it was a fast racecar. We knew that. We just had to keep our heads in the game and do what we know how to do." He also added that he was "excited, pumped up, jacked up to come to this racetrack and show what we’re made of." After qualifying second, Kasey Kahne said that his performance felt "good. The car was really fast, this Great Clips Chevrolet. The guys did a nice job in practice and in qualifying. I just kept getting better with my laps…The car is fine. Just let me get my laps a little better. I feel good about it (the car). We had a top-10 here the last race, last year; with the backup car because I crashed it in qualifying and this car is better than our primary car was last time.” He also added that Logano "barely got us. But it is definitely a good starting spot. That was one of my goals today was to help out on pit road. Pit road is huge here. We have the best pit crew for stops, than anyone, in my opinion. And if I can help them on pit road, myself, and get a better spot, I think all that will be beneficial on Sunday." After qualifying third, Brian Vickers said he was "so close; the No. 22 was really strong. I thought we had it when he ran a 51 (19.51) I thought we could beat that. We made a small adjustment going into the last round and I don't know maybe that hurt us a little bit. It is so tight. We are fighting for hundredths of a second, thousandths of a second, but everybody on the No. 14 Chevrolet did a good job. I'm really proud of everyone. Mike (Bugarewicz, crew chief) gave me a great race car. Everyone at Stewart-Haas Racing, Chevy, it's an honor to put the Arnie’s Army and Janssen Chevrolet in the top three.”

Qualifying results

Practice (post-qualifying)

Second practice

Final practice

Race

First half

Start
Under clear blue Virginia skies, Joey Logano led the field to the green flag at 1:19 p.m. The first caution of the race flew on the fifth lap for a single-car spin in turn 2. Dale Earnhardt Jr. bounced off the side of David Ragan's car and spun out.

The race restarted on lap 10. Going into turn 3, Paul Menard dove under Logano to take the lead on lap 22. Kyle Busch dove under Menard going into turn 3 to take the lead on lap 33. The second caution of the race flew on lap 91 for a single-car spin in turn 2. Menard got into the left-rear corner of Brian Scott, sent him into Michael Annett and sent him spinning. Denny Hamlin and Brad Keselowski were tagged for speeding on pit road and restarted the race from the tail-end of the field.

The race restarted on lap 98. Kevin Harvick drove under Busch to take the lead on lap 101. He retook the lead on lap 107. Matt Kenseth drove by his teammate exiting turn 2 to take the lead on lap 133. The third caution of the race flew on lap 136 for a single-car wreck in turn 2. Regan Smith sent Ricky Stenhouse Jr. spinning into the wall.

Second quarter
The race restarted on lap 145. Busch drove by the outside of Kenseth going into turn 3 to retake the lead on lap 147. Harvick drove by Busch going into turn 1 to take the lead on lap 156. Aric Almirola retired from the race on lap 208 due to engine issues and would go on to finish last. The fourth caution of the race flew on lap 222 for a single-car wreck in turn 1. Hamlin's wheel hopped going into the turn and slammed the wall. He said afterwards that it was the "first time ever doing it here, so it’s a little embarrassing, but I mean we were the fastest car those last 30 laps and we got back to the top-five and I was making up a lot of my speed on entry. As the tires wear, the rears get hotter, less grip, you can’t brake at the same amount – it was really out of the blue. I didn’t ever have a hint of it up until that moment, so a bit of a rookie move on my part. Been around here too much to do something like that, but learning for the fall and I’m really encouraged about how good our car came up through the pack and I really thought we had a car that could win.” Harvick and Kenseth swapped the lead on pit road and the latter exited with the lead.

The race restarted on lap 228. Busch retook the lead on lap 230. The fifth caution of the race flew on lap 312 for a single-car wreck in turn 2. Josh Wise suffered a tire blowout and slammed the wall. Reed Sorenson was tagged for having too many crew members over the wall and restarted the race from the tail-end of the field.

Second half

Halfway

The race restarted on lap 321. Busch worked past Kenseth to retake the lead on lap 325. The sixth caution of the race flew with 117 laps to go for a single-car wreck in turn 2. Exiting the turn, Michael Annett got loose and spun out. Logano was tagged for an uncontrolled tire and restarted the race from the tail-end of the field.

Fourth quarter
The race restarted with 110 laps to go. The seventh caution of the race flew with 45 laps to go for a single-car wreck in turn 2. Regan Smith suffered a right-front tire blowout and slammed the wall. Chase Elliott was tagged for speeding on pit road and restarted the race from the tail-end of the field.

The race restarted with 34 laps to go. The eighth caution of the race flew with 17 laps to go for a single-car spin on the backstretch. Jamie McMurray suffered a left-front tire blowout, got hit in the rear and turned.

The race restarted with 14 laps and went green for the rest of the race. Busch drove on to score the checkered flag.

Post-race

Driver comments
Busch said after the race that he "had a really good car through practice and Adam (Stevens, crew chief) made some really good adjustments overnight to keep us where we need to be in order to run up front all day, led a lot of laps, probably led the most laps there and to win here in Martinsville is pretty cool – finally get to take a clock home." He also added that he "can't say enough about this whole JGR team. The M&M's Camry was awesome in practice. We had a really good car through practice, and Adam made some really good adjustments overnight to keep us where we needed to be, running up front all day."

A. J. Allmendinger said of his second–place finish and his strong runs of late that they're "something that really started on the West Coast swing and coming through here, I feel like we've been at our best at the end of these races. We've maximized. That's the biggest thing we always say — if we can just maximize our finishes, whether they're top-fives or you're running 20th and you can get 18th an out of it, that's what we want to do.”

“It was a solid weekend for myself. I was able to do double-duty this week and I think that helped me get my rhythm early in the weekend,” Larson said. “It bettered myself each time I was on the track. Normally a truck does not drive anything like a Cup car. This is the only race track probably where it does. Getting more laps on this racetrack is the most important part for myself."

Race results

Race summary
 Lead changes: 11
 Cautions: 8 for 51
 Red flags: 0
 Time of race: 3 hours, 17 minutes, and 2 seconds
 Average speed:

Media

Television
Fox Sports was covering their 16th race at the Martinsville Speedway. Mike Joy, nine-time Martinsville winner Jeff Gordon and 11-time Martinsville winner Darrell Waltrip called in the booth for the race. Jamie Little, Vince Welch and Matt Yocum handled pit road duties for the entire race.

Radio
MRN had the radio call for the race which would also be simulcasted on Sirius XM NASCAR Radio. Joe Moore, Jeff Striegle and seven-time Martinsville winner Rusty Wallace called the race in the booth as the cars were on the frontstretch. Dave Moody called the race from atop the turn 3 stands as the field is racing down the backstretch. Alex Hayden, Winston Kelley and Steve Post worked pit road for the radio side.

Standings after the race

Drivers' Championship standings

Manufacturers' Championship standings

Note: Only the first 16 positions are included for the driver standings.

References

STP 500
STP 500
NASCAR races at Martinsville Speedway
STP 500